The Farm is a reality competition television franchise format created by the Swedish producer Strix. Over 100 licenses sold around the world and aired in more than 50 countries, The Farm is one of their most popular formats, including The Bar and Fame Factory. Has been constantly on air somewhere in the world since 2021. The format is distributed by Fremantle.

Format
The Farm puts a group of 12 to 14 people living together in a farm. The contestants must work as a normal farmer, raising animals and doing agriculture. In regular periods of time, one of the houseguests is evicted, usually in a ceremony called The Duel where they compete in a physical endurance, but in some adaptations of the show, it is the audience that decides, by telephone voting, who must leave The Farm.

Celebrity format, with participants being well-known public figures, is also common.

International versions

 there are 132 winners of The Farm format.

: Currently airing
 An upcoming season
 Status unknown
 No longer airing

Current franchises
 Season currently being aired.
 Upcoming season in casting process.
 Casting process completed, and ready to be aired shortly after.

References

External links

 Celebrity Farm Brazil
 The Farm Bulgaria
 Farma Croatia
 Home to the Farm Denmark
 The Farm Finland
 The Farm Greece
 Celebrity Farm Hungary
 The Farm Norway
 The Farm Poland
 Celebrity Farm Romania 
 Farma Slovakia
 Kmetija Slovenia
 Celebrity Farm Spain
 The Farm Sweden
 Celebrity Farm Sweden

 
Endemol Shine Group franchises
Reality television series franchises